Digital Comic Museum is a digital library of comic books in the public domain, established in 2010.

References

External links
 

Websites about comics
Digital libraries
Online comic databases
Comic book collecting
Public domain comics
Public domain databases